Crazy House is a 1928 Our Gang short silent comedy film directed by Robert F. McGowan. It was the 76th Our Gang short that was released.

Cast

The Gang
 Jean Darling as Jean
 Joe Cobb as Joe
 Jackie Condon as Jackie
 Allen Hoskins as Farina
 Bobby Hutchins as Wheezer
 Mary Ann Jackson as Mary Ann
 Jay R. Smith as Percy
 Harry Spear as Harry
 Jimmy Farren as Our Gang member
 Pete the Pup as Pansy

Additional cast
 Bill Ulmer as Kid watching fight
 Ben Parsons as Kid watching fight
 Eugene "Bobo" Pearson as Kid watching fight
 Charles A. Bachman as Officer
 Ed Brandenburg as Workman
 George W. Girard as Percy's father
 F. F. Guenste as Butler
 Eric Mayne as Friend of Percy's father
 May Wallace as Jean's mother
 Kathleen Chambers as Undetermined role

See also
 Our Gang filmography

References

External links

1928 films
1928 comedy films
1928 short films
American silent short films
American black-and-white films
Films directed by Robert F. McGowan
Metro-Goldwyn-Mayer short films
Our Gang films
1920s American films
Silent American comedy films